Capitaine René Doumer (October 31, 1887 – April 26, 1917) was a French World War I flying ace credited with seven confirmed aerial victories and four unconfirmed combat claims.

Biography

Born on October 31, 1887, René Doumer was one of the eight children of Paul Doumer (President of France 1931–1932) and Blanche Doumer (née Richel). He was a professional lieutenant when World War I began, having been a chasseur since 1908. He was seriously wounded on 17 September 1914 in circumstances that won him the Legion d'Honneur. After recovery, he transferred to aviation. His first assignment was to fly a Caudron for Escadrille 64. He scored his first two victories with this unit, on 19 and 30 March 1916. He transferred to a Nieuport fighter unit next, Escadrille 76. He would rack up five more wins between 23 October 1916 and 28 March 1917. He would also succeed to command of Escadrille 76. He was killed by Erich Hahn on 26 April 1917.

List of aerial victories
See also Aerial victory standards of World War I

Sources of information

References

Nieuport Aces of World War 1. Norman Franks. Osprey Publishing, 2000. , .
 Franks, Norman; Bailey, Frank (1993). Over the Front: The Complete Record of the Fighter Aces and Units of the United States and French Air Services, 1914–1918 London, UK: Grub Street Publishing. .

1887 births
1917 deaths
French World War I flying aces
French military personnel killed in World War I
Children of national leaders of France